Admiralty station may refer to
 Admiralty station in Admiralty, Hong Kong part of the MTR.
 Admiralty MRT station on North South Line of Singapore's MRT
See also
 Admiralty